Vecherniy Novosibirsk (Russian: "Вечерний Новосибирск" ~ The Evening Novosibirsk) is a newspaper published in Novosibirsk, Russia.  It comes out five times a week, 250 times a year.

As of 2007, the editor-in-chief is Vladimir Ivanovich Kuzmenkin.

See also
 Sovetskaya Sibir

External links
Internet site

Newspapers published in Novosibirsk
Russian-language newspapers published in Russia
Publications with year of establishment missing